The Argentine Federal Police ( or PFA) is the national civil police force of the Argentine federal government. The PFA has detachments throughout the country. Until January 1, 2017, it also acted as the local law enforcement agency in the capital, Buenos Aires.

History
The history of this police force can be traced to 1580, when the founder of Buenos Aires, Captain Juan de Garay, established a local militia for defense against potential Native American raids. The Policía de Buenos Aires (Buenos Aires Police) operated for the first three hundred years up to 1880, when the Federalization of Buenos Aires resulted in the creation of the Policía de la Capital (Police of the Capital).

Incidents of social unrest in subsequent years helped prompt the Fraga Law in 1904, which provided for the inclusion of neighborhood representatives as commissioners in their respective precincts. The failed Revolution of 1905, by which the UCR sought to bring about reforms to the undemocratic electoral system, led to the appointment of a conservative congressman, retired Col. Ramón Falcón, to the post of chief of police; Falcón's repressive tenure ended with his 1909 assassination.

The current entity resulted from an initiative by the chief of police, Col. Emilio Ramírez, assisted by LTCOL Enrique Fentanes. A panel convened by the police chief presented its findings to support the establishment of the Federal Police on November 8, 1943, and on December 24, Decree 17.750 was signed by President Pedro Pablo Ramírez (the father of the chief of police). The new force did not immediately replace the Capital Police, but was instead transferred duties under the latter's purview incrementally. The first important such transfer was the February 7, 1944, assignment as the Presidential Guard of the Casa Rosada, and on March 10, the process of unifying the two forces was initiated by decree, concluding officially on January 1, 1945.

The Federal Police changed slowly in its organizational structure in subsequent decades. Initially maintaining 45 precincts, it added five in 1946, two in 1976, and a 53rd in 1999. Its subordinate role to the national executive increasingly made the force a political instrument during the country's often authoritarian regimes. General Juan Carlos Onganía, president after a 1966 coup, named a Federal Police director, Luis Margaride, who shared his distaste for modern culture, resulting in crusades against nightclubs, long hair, and miniskirts. Facing a government policy backdrop such as this, numerous avant-garde artists (and others, particularly in academia) left Argentina, many never to return.  The return of exiled President Juan Perón in 1973 resulted in conflict with the PFA, when the calculating populist had Alberto Villar named as chief at the behest of adviser José López Rega. Villar was a member of López Rega's newly organized paramilitary group, the Argentine Anticommunist Alliance, and Villar's participation in spiraling violence between the group and those on the far left led to his assassination in 1974. The institution's prestige was further damaged following the March 1976 coup, when the force participated in the abduction, torture and murder of thousands of dissidents and others. It was only with the 1983 presidential elections (and the return to democratic rule) that the FP began restoring its prestige and its relations with the Argentine people, especially with the 1986 appointment of  Juan Angel Pirker as police commissioner general.

The 1993 Olivos Pact between President Carlos Menem and his predecessor, UCR leader Raúl Alfonsín resulted in the 1994 reform of the Argentine Constitution, whose article 129 granted the City of Buenos Aires greater self-governance. This in principle included the transfer of control of the 25,000-strong Federal Police to the Jefe de Gobierno (elected Mayor), and the Buenos Aires City Legislature. Shortly before the historic, June 30, 1996, elections to these posts, however, a senior Peronist Senator, Antonio Cafiero, succeeded in limiting the city's autonomy by advancing National Law 24.588, which reserved control of the force, among other faculties, to the national government.

The controversial bill, signed in 1996 by President Menem, remained a sticking point between successive Presidents (most of whom have been Peronist) and Buenos Aires Mayors (none of whom have been). A 2005 agreement on principles between Mayor Aníbal Ibarra and President Néstor Kirchner was followed by the modification of the especially contentious article 7, which denied the city its own, local police force, in 2007 - though the "Cafiero Law" otherwise remains in force. Efforts since 2007 by Mayor Mauricio Macri to declare it unconstitutional have thus far failed, and though the Mayor inaugurated a Metropolitan Police, issues of revenue sharing for its financing remain pending.

The PFA, since 1974, maintains a university specializing in criminology, is associated with Interpol, and participates in special forces training programs at the Los Angeles Police Department.

In January 2017, most of the Federal Police agents serving in the city of Buenos Aires were transferred to a new local law enforcement agency, the Buenos Aires City Police. The new agency took over the local policing responsibilities in the capital city.

General organization

The PFA is subordinate to the Ministry of Security. The organization is headed by the Chief of the PFA, the Comisario General Juan Carlos Hernández, assisted by the Deputy Chief of the PFA, Comisario General Osvaldo Mato.

The over 12,000 m2 (128,000 ft²) resulted from an 1868 proposal for its construction, which was ultimately approved in 1884. Designed by Juan Antonio Buschiazzo, and engineered by Francesco Tamburini, the ornate headquarters is an eclectic structure with influences from Baroque architecture, and features a number of patios, notably the central, Palm Tree Patio. Argentine Passports were issued to local residents at this location until 1996.

The organization of the PFA is as follows:

Jefatura (General Headquarters)Subjefatura (Subheadquarters)Superintendencias (Superintendencies)Superintendencia de Administración (Superintendency of Administration)Superintendencia de Bienestar (Superintendency of Welfare)Superintendencia Federal de Bomberos (Federal Firefighting Superintendency)Superintendencia de Investigaciones Federales (Superintendency of Federal Investigation)Superintendencia de Planificación y Desarrollo (Superintendency of Planning and Development)Superintendencia de Personal, Instrucción y Derechos Humanos (Superintendency of Personnel, Instruction and Human Rights)Superintendencia de Policía Científica (Superintendency of Scientific Police)Superintendencia Federal de Tecnologías de la Información y Comunicaciones (Federal Superintendency of Information Technologies and Communications)Superintendencia de Interior y Delitos Federales Complejos (Superintendency of Interior and Federal Complex Crimes)Superintendencia de Drogas Peligrosas (Superintendency of Dangerous Drugs)Superintendencia de Asuntos Internos (Superintendency of Internal Affairs)Superintendencia Federal de Transporte (Federal Superintendency of Transportation)Direcciones Generales Autónomas (General Autonomic Directorates)Dirección General Autónoma de Asuntos Jurídicos (General Autonomic Directorate of Legal Affairs)Dirección General Autónoma de Asuntos Internos (General Autonomic Directorate of Internal Affairs)

Superintendencies are commanded by a superintendente, a less common word in Spanish. Both superintendente and the much more common Spanish word comisario normally translate into English as superintendent, which creates some translation problems when discussing Argentine police services.

Training for all serving agents of the service is done by the following institutions:
Federal Police Agentss and NCOs School "Don Enrique O'Gorman"
Federal Police Academy "Commissioner General Juan Angel Pirker"
Federal Police Staff College "Comisario General Enrique Fentanes"

Aside from its former stations in Buenos Aires, it maintains provincial stations in select capital cities and several towns of the Provinces of Argentina. The FFS also doubles as the state fire service as well.

Special forces

Federal Operations Special Group

The GEOF is a specialized police unit of the General Directorate of International Terrorism and Complex Crimes. Although the existence of special forces in Argentina begins in 1930, the unit was officially created after the 1994 AMIA bombing. In 1994 its first section was established in Tucumán and in 1997 a second division was constituted in Rosario. In the next year the Buenos Aires group was formed.

Special Group One

The unit was established under the denomination of Special Combat Teams in 1978, when Argentina hosted the Football World Cup. Ten years later, in 1988, the division changed its name to Police Operations Group and officially became the premier counter-terrorism team of the Federal Police.

Police ranks
Officer Ranks (in descending order)

Sub-Officer Ranks (in descending order)

Equipment

Aircraft
The Dirección General de Aviación Federal'' is a unit of PFA agents, responsible for transportation policeman to anywhere in the country, besides the air support operations to the Federal Police. It has multipurpose aircraft for health functions, VIP transport, search, patrol, fire fighting, rescue and tactical operations. Its operational base is the heliport of Isla Demarchi (Heliport Dársena Sur).
Its current fleet includes:
MBB Bo 105
MBB/Kawasaki BK 117
Eurocopter EC135
Eurocopter EC145
Cessna Citation I
Cessna 421

Vehicles
Ford Focus
Ford Ranger
Chevrolet Classic
Iveco Daily
Mercedes-Benz Sprinter
BDX
Dongfeng Mengshi

Firearms
Pistols
Bersa Thunder 9
Glock 17
Beretta 92
Submachine guns
FMK-3
Heckler & Koch MP5
Uzi
Halcón ML-63
Battle/Assault rifles
FN FAL
Heckler & Koch HK33
SIG SG 552 Commando
IWI ACE
Shotguns
Ithaca 37
Remington 870
Machine guns
FN Minimi
FN MAG
IWI Negev
Sniper rifles
M24 SWS
H-S Precision HTR
M110 SASS

See also

Albatross Group
Scorpion Group
Hawk Special Operations Brigade
Federal Special Operations Group
Interior Security System
Law Enforcement in Argentina

References

External links

  

Government agencies established in 1943
Federal law enforcement agencies of Argentina
1943 establishments in Argentina